"Träd fram du nattens gud" (Step forth, thou god of night), "Aftonkväde" (Song at Nightfall), or Fredmans sånger no. 32 is a nature-lyrical Swedish song by Carl Michael Bellman, a nocturne in the style of Edward Young's Night-Thoughts.

The song depicts gods and other mythological beings, and a summer night after a long drought. In the night landscape are peace and rest, but also threatening creatures, both natural, like snakes and martens, and supernatural. Nature is strongly mythologised; night falls because a god commands it, bringing sleep to the mythical beings. The song ends with an announcement that the narrator is falling asleep.

Context

Song

Music and verse form 

The song is in  time and is marked Andante. No source has been found for the elegant and neat melody, implying it may be Bellman's own composition; the metre is certainly Bellman's. Each stanza is of five lines, consisting of two alexandrines, a hemistich (half-length line), an alexandrine, and a final hemistich; the rhyming scheme follows the same pattern, AABAB.

Lyrics 

"Aftonkväde" is included among Bellman's 1791 Fredman's songs as number 32; its first version was written in 1780, but it was reworked in 1784 prior to printing. From being a classicist depiction of an animated archaic landscape peopled by ancient gods, it contains more realistic details in the spirit of James Thomson. The verse size is similar to that used by Johan Gabriel Oxenstierna in his poem Natten (Night). The poem first appeared in Bellman's 1780 En stuf rim, a collection of his earliest poems with some new compositions, like this one, imitating Oxenstierna, who in turn was following Edward Young's popular Night-Thoughts, published 1742–1745. The poem has been translated by Paul Britten Austin.

Analysis 

In terms of content, the poem combines a poetic integration of gods and other mythological beings, with a realistic, though idealized, depiction of a summer night after a long period of drought. Technically, it resembles several of Fredman's epistles, since the poet commands "the god of the night" to transform day to night and bring coolness to the world and the minds of the people, which are thus linked together. The nightly landscape, however, offers not only peace and rest, but threatening creatures - initially "moles, snakes, and martens", then cyclopes, fauns and supernatural guests, who, however, are asked by the shepherd Alexis to lie down to rest. After he has similarly quieted the powers of the wind and the water, the poem's last stanza shows a typical ambiguity for Bellman, when Arachne (a Greek nymph, her name meaning "Spider") is asked to trap Alexis's needle: is it a question of the myth or a poetic rewriting for the spider, related to the serpents and the martens? Regardless, the poem ends with another typical scene, with the announcement that the narrator is about to fall asleep, which certainly was meant to be depicted at the performance.

The suggestion that the poem depicts the farm Sågtorp at Erstavik, based on its dedication to the assessor Weltzin, who had this farm as a summer residence, is doubtful.

Carina Burman writes in her biography of Bellman that the song's fifteen stanzas describe how night falls. In a strongly mythologised Nature, night does not fall because of the laws of physics but because a god commands it, as acknowledged in the line "Your quilt covers everything". This applies on the large scale and the small: the lake cools, as does people's blood. Both humans and Nature's mythical beings – "cyclopes, fauns" – are made to be quiet: "Apollo himself is playing". The god's performance brings sleep to the mythical beings, and the poet himself ends the song by going to sleep: "But now – now I shall sleep". Burman comments that the poet's sleep brings the whole world to rest, as no-one is left to portray it in song.

References

Sources

 
 
 
 
  (with facsimiles of sheet music from first editions in 1790, 1791)

External links 

 Träd fram, du nattens gud (full text)

Swedish songs
Swedish-language songs
Works by Carl Michael Bellman
Fredmans sånger